Megamol is a 1994 Philippine comedy film co-written and directed by Eddie Rodriguez. The film stars Sharon Cuneta and Andrew E.. The film's title is a play on SM Megamall and is a portmanteau of the lead stars' respective nicknames Mega and Gamol.

The film is streaming online on YouTube.

Plot
Set on a road-trip narrative, Corazon (Sharon Cuneta) and Clark (Andrew E.) have an adventure throughout Metro Manila running away from kidnappers led by Brando (Bong Alvarez). They escape the kidnappers after a confrontation with Brando in a Jollibee restaurant while eating on a pick up truck to Clark's house where his cousin Bugoy (Smokey Manaloto) and Neneng (Maybelline dela Cruz) live causing chaos along the way in the process. However the kidnappers locate them when they follow Bugoy who was riding the pick up truck which they recognized while Bugoy was in a gas station refueling the pick up truck to Clark's house causing Clark and Corazon to escape back to Metro Manila to get help leaving Bugoy and Neneng behind unharmed. When they reach the attorney's (Charito Solis) house with help from Clark's boss Mr. Calderon (Jon Achaval) they defeat the kidnappers and Elias (Andy Poe) who is behind the kidnapping attempt on Corazon is arrested by his wife Marga (Gloria Sevilla) who discovered his treachery and she explains to Corazon that her husband is behind on attempt so he wants the money to belong to her. In the end, they became rich.

Cast
Sharon Cuneta as Cora
Andrew E. as Clark
Charito Solis as Atty. Isabel Enriquez
Gloria Sevilla as Marga
Andy Poe as Elias
Smokey Manaloto as Bugoy
Bong Alvarez as Brando
Marjorie Barretto as Gilda
Michael Vera Perez as Mike
Kate Gomez as Kate
Melissa Gibbs as Mel
Janine Barredo as Brando's Girl
Maybelyn as Neneng
Gil Baltazar as Kidnap Victim
Philip Gamboa as Military General
Jon Achaval as Mr. Calderon

References

External links

Full Movie on Viva Films

1994 films
1994 comedy films
1990s adventure films
Films directed by Eddie Rodriguez
Philippine comedy films